Mason Williams is an American musician.

Other individuals by that name include:

 Mason Lamar Williams, an American engineer
 Mason Williams, a former ring name of American professional wrestler Mason Ryan
 Mason Williams (baseball), an American baseball player

See also 
 Maston Williams